Wethersfield may refer to the following places:

 Wethersfield, Connecticut, United States
 Wethersfield, Essex, an English village near RAF Wethersfield
 RAF Wethersfield, a British Ministry of Defence training facility in Essex, England
 Wethersfield, New York, United States
 Wethersfield, Vermont, United States

See also 
 Weathersfield (disambiguation)